A Brandy Alexander is a brandy-based dessert cocktail consisting of cognac, crème de cacao, and cream, that became popular during the early 20th century. It is a variation of an earlier, gin-based cocktail called simply an Alexander. The cocktail known as Alexander today may contain gin or brandy. Ice cream can be added for a "frozen Brandy Alexander".

History 
There are many rumours about its origins. Some sources say it was created at the time of the London wedding of Princess Mary and Viscount Lascelles in 1922. Drama critic and Algonquin Round Table member Alexander Woollcott said it was named after him. Other sources say it was named after the Russian tsar Alexander II.

The drink was possibly named after Troy Alexander, a bartender at Rector's, a New York City restaurant, who created the drink in order to serve a white drink at a dinner celebrating Phoebe Snow, a character in a popular advertising campaign in the early 20th century.

John Lennon was introduced to it on 12 March 1974, by Harry Nilsson, on Lennon's so-called "lost weekend". The pair began heckling the Smothers Brothers, and whilst being ejected Lennon allegedly assaulted a waitress. Lennon later said the drinks "tasted like milkshakes".

In film and television

In the movie Days of Wine and Roses, alcoholic Joe Clay (Jack Lemmon) takes Kirsten Arnesen (Lee Remick) out on a date. When she explains that she dislikes liquor but likes chocolate, he orders her a Brandy Alexander. This begins Kirsten's descent into alcoholism.

In the 1981 film Tattoo, Bruce Dern takes Maud Adams out for dinner and orders a Brandy Alexander. When she comments that he does not look the Brandy Alexander type, he replies, "I like the foam...it reminds me of the ocean."

In the episode "Anniversary Reunion" of Fantasy Island aired on 28 January 1978, the character played by Jim Backus gives Brandy Alexanders to Tom and Toni Elgen. Tom Elgen is played by Ronnie Cox.
 
The 1981 Granada Television production of Brideshead Revisited, episode 1, (based on the novel by Evelyn Waugh) has a scene where Anthony Blanche (Nickolas Grace) offers Charles Ryder (Jeremy Irons) two Brandy Alexanders while at Oxford.

In the show Three's Company, Jack Tripper is catering a party where one of the guests orders a Brandy Alexander from Mr. Roper, who is the bartender. Mr. Roper tells her his name is Stanley and that she does not want to drink that junk. He tries to give her a fresh bourbon instead.

In the show Cheers episode 9 of season 1, Diane (Shelley Long) orders three drinks, one being a Brandy Alexander, from Carla (Rhea Perlman) who then just gives her three beers instead.

In the James Gray movie Two Lovers, Michelle (Gwyneth Paltrow) tells Leonard (Joaquin Phoenix) she drinks Brandy Alexanders with her boyfriend Ronald, a rich lawyer. Leonard orders one at a restaurant to impress her, but ruins the effect by mistaking the stirrer for a straw.

In the first episode of The Mary Tyler Moore Show, Mary asks Lou Grant for a Brandy Alexander in her job interview.

In the film A Glimpse Inside the Mind of Charles Swan III, Charlie Sheen's character drinks Brandy Alexanders throughout the film. 

In the film Bedazzled, Brendan Fraser allegedly drinks Brandy Alexanders and runs around singing while wearing his Speedo.

In the Netflix movie Between Two Ferns: The Movie, Zach Galifianakis orders a Brandy Alexander while talking to Chrissy Teigen at a bar.

In the show Starsky and Hutch, episode ‘Hutchinson: Murder One’, Hutch orders his ex-wife a Brandy Alexander in Huggy’s ‘The Pits’ bar.

In the show Mad Men, season 1, episode 11, ‘Indian Summer,’ Peggy Olson orders a Brandy Alexander for herself while out on a date, stating that another character, Joan Holloway, usually orders them for her and that this one is less sweet than she is used to.

In print
The character Brandy Alexander in the novel Invisible Monsters by Chuck Palahniuk is named after the drink.

Anthony Blanche orders four "Alexandra cocktails" in Evelyn Waugh's novel Brideshead Revisited. The Granada Television adaptation for television helped repopularize the drink in the 1980s. Christian Kracht repeats the four Brandy Alexanders motif in his 1995 novel Faserland.
 
In Kurt Vonnegut's book, Mother Night, the protagonist suspects that an overly flattering article in the Herald Tribune about his neighbor was "written by a pansy full of Brandy Alexanders."

See also 
 Alexander, a related cocktail that antedates the Brandy Alexander
 List of cocktails

References

External links 

 IBA Official Cocktails

Cocktails with brandy
Cocktails with chocolate liqueur
Cocktails with ice cream
Creamy cocktails